Mahni is a village in the Bhakkar District, Punjab, Pakistan. It is located at 31°37'60N 71°4'0E at an elevation of 159 metres and lies near the boundary of districts Khushab and Jhang. It has a population of almost 30,000 and was given status as Union Council.

Bhakkar was founded probably towards the end of the fifteenth century by a body of colonists from Dera Ismail Khan The Bhakkar was found by Syed ABSAR Shah who came from the city of Bokhara from Russia.

Mahni is a dry desert with little vegetation and mostly thorny bushes over a breadth of 70 miles. The land is arid and depends upon the weather conditions. They cultivate grains only.

The people mutually share a living tradition of values.

There are many different kinds of castes in Mahni village. The karlu caste is considered as the main caste of the village. Other casts are Bhidwal, Kachela, Bhular, Bhatti, Nai, Dirkhan, Syed, and Cheena, etc.

Bhidwal family is most of the educated, landlord and political family of Mahni Thal, Current Chairman of union council mahni, Malik Javed also belongs to bhidwal family as well, most of the castes like kachela, bhular, seyal, Nai, Dirkhan, syed and Cheena have political clobration with bhidwal family, 

Mahni has the following schools: Govt High School Mahni, Govt Girls Elementary School, Govt Boys Primary School. There is also a private School (Perwaz Public School).

A Mela At Darbar Hazrat Peer Shah Bakshana is held every year on 17–18 March. The Biggest Camel's form is also situated in Mahni.

References

Bhakkar District